Mairehau is a suburb of Christchurch, New Zealand. It is located four kilometres north of the city centre, close to the edge of the urbanised central city area. Much new development is being carried out on the northern edge of Mairehau.

The suburb was named after Rose Mairehau (Maire) Hutton (née Rhodes), daughter of Arthur Rhodes, who in turn was Mayor of Christchurch in 1901–1902 and a major local property owner.

Demographics

Mairehau had a population of 6,870 at the 2018 New Zealand census, an increase of 360 people (5.5%) since the 2013 census, and an increase of 1,089 people (18.8%) since the 2006 census. There were 2,547 households. There were 3,321 males and 3,549 females, giving a sex ratio of 0.94 males per female, with 1,335 people (19.4%) aged under 15 years, 1,350 (19.7%) aged 15 to 29, 2,976 (43.3%) aged 30 to 64, and 1,206 (17.6%) aged 65 or older.

Ethnicities were 84.7% European/Pākehā, 10.3% Māori, 4.0% Pacific peoples, 8.4% Asian, and 2.9% other ethnicities (totals add to more than 100% since people could identify with multiple ethnicities).

The proportion of people born overseas was 20.0%, compared with 27.1% nationally.

Although some people objected to giving their religion, 51.4% had no religion, 38.0% were Christian, 0.9% were Hindu, 1.0% were Muslim, 0.5% were Buddhist and 2.4% had other religions.

Of those at least 15 years old, 1,167 (21.1%) people had a bachelor or higher degree, and 966 (17.5%) people had no formal qualifications. The employment status of those at least 15 was that 2,781 (50.2%) people were employed full-time, 738 (13.3%) were part-time, and 186 (3.4%) were unemployed.

Education
Mairehau High School is a secondary school for years 9 to 13. The school opened in 1961.

Mairehau School is a full primary school catering for years 1 to 8. The school opened in 1953. Birch Grove School closed and merged with Mairehau School in 2004. Glenmoor School closed in 2014.

St Francis of Assisi Catholic School is a state-integrated full primary school catering for years 1 to 8. The school opened in 2016 as the result of a merger between Our Lady of Fatima School and St Paul's School.

All these schools are coeducational. Rolls are as of

References

External links
 http://www.mairehau.school.nz/ - Official School Site

Suburbs of Christchurch